Edward Joyner (born June 28, 1972) is an American college basketball coach and current head men's basketball coach at Hampton University.  He had previously been an assistant coach at his alma mater Johnson C. Smith University.

Head coaching record

References

External links
 Hampton profile

1972 births
Living people
American men's basketball coaches
American men's basketball players
Hampton Pirates men's basketball coaches
Johnson C. Smith Golden Bulls basketball coaches
Johnson C. Smith Golden Bulls basketball players